Mordeh Kheyr (also known as Mordeh Khar, Mordeh Kher, Mūrdeh Kheyr, and Murdeh Khir) is a village in Dehrud Rural District, Eram District, Dashtestan County, Bushehr Province, Iran. At the 2006 census, its population was 177, in 36 families.

References 

Populated places in Dashtestan County